The Bayeux Tapestry tituli are Medieval Latin captions that are embroidered on the Bayeux Tapestry and describe scenes portrayed on the tapestry.  These depict events leading up to the Norman conquest of England concerning William, Duke of Normandy, and Harold, Earl of Wessex, later King of England, and culminating in the Battle of Hastings.

Description

The Bayeux Tapestry was probably commissioned by William the Conqueror's half-brother, Bishop Odo, possibly at the same time as Bayeux Cathedral's construction in the 1070s, and completed by 1077 in time for display on the cathedral's dedication. It is embroidered in wool yarn on a tabby-woven linen ground using outline or stem stitch for detailing and lettering. 
A dark blue wool, almost black, is used for most of the tapestry's lettering but towards the end other colours are used, sometimes for each word and other times for each letter.

The content of the hanging is primarily pictorial but tituli are included on many scenes of the action to point out names of people and places or to explain briefly the event being depicted. The text is in Latin (which for the most part is grammatically correct), and is extremely direct, with each statement being closely tied to the scenes depicted in a given section. The text is frequently abbreviated as indicated by tildes placed over words at the place of omission of a letter. The words themselves are often demarcated by two points (which Lucien Musset likens to colons); sometimes, more important section breaks are demarcated by three points. Many personal names, mostly in English, are not Latinised and the same applies for names of places in England and for Beaurain "Belrem" in France. In places the spelling shows an English influence, such as the phrase "at Hestenga ceastra", which in proper Latin would be "ad Hastingae castra"). Some French names are either archaic ("Rednes") or anglicised ("Bagias"). Sometimes "Franci" is used to describe the Normans who at that time certainly did not regard themselves as French.

The end of the tapestry has been missing from time immemorial and the final titulus "Et fuga verterunt Angli" is said by Lucien Musset to be "entirely spurious", added shortly before 1814 at a time of anti-English sentiment. The first word on the tapestry "Edward" is also a restoration.

Latin text with English translation

The English translation provided here is of a literal nature, to reflect the simplicity of the captions themselves. The numbering scheme uses the scene numbers on the tapestry's backing cloth, which were added sometime around 1800.

Notes

References

Citations

Sources

External links
Bayeux Tapestry Museum
Latin-English translation

Anglo-Saxon art
Embroidery
Memory of the World Register
Norman conquest of England
Romanesque art
Tapestries
Military art
Latin texts of Anglo-Saxon England